The 2008 Bell Helicopter Armed Forces Bowl was the sixth edition of the annual post-season college football bowl game, and was a bowl rematch of a regular season game between the Houston Cougars against the Air Force Falcons that was won by Air Force, 31–28.  It was played on December 31, 2008, at Amon G. Carter Stadium on the campus of Texas Christian University in Fort Worth, Texas, and telecast on ESPN nationally. The Falcons made their second straight Armed Forces Bowl appearance, having lost the previous year to California, while the Cougars made their fourth straight bowl appearance, having most recently lost to TCU. The Cougars defeated the Falcons 34–28, for their first bowl win since the 1980 Garden State Bowl ending an eight-bowl game losing streak.

Scoring summary

See also
 2008–09 NCAA football bowl games

References

External links

 Final Stat Sheet

Armed Forces Bowl
Armed Forces Bowl
Air Force Falcons football bowl games
Houston Cougars football bowl games
Armed Forces Bowl
Armed Forces Bowl